Bone morphogenetic protein 6 is a protein that in humans is encoded by the BMP6 gene.

The protein encoded by this gene is a member of the TGFβ superfamily. Bone morphogenetic proteins are known for their ability to induce the growth of bone and cartilage. BMP6 is able to induce all osteogenic markers in mesenchymal stem cells.

The bone morphogenetic proteins (BMPs) are a family of secreted signaling molecules that can induce ectopic bone growth. BMPs are part of the transforming growth factor-beta (TGFB) superfamily. BMPs were originally identified by an ability of demineralized bone extract to induce endochondral osteogenesis in vivo in an extraskeletal site. Based on its expression early in embryogenesis, the BMP encoded by this gene has a proposed role in early development. In addition, the fact that this BMP is closely related to BMP5 and BMP7 has led to speculation of possible bone inductive activity.
As of April 2009, an additional function of BMP6 has been identified as described in Nature Genetics April; 41 [4]:386-8. BMP6 is the key regulator of hepcidin, the small peptide secreted by the liver which is the major regulator of iron metabolism in mammals.

References

Further reading

External links
 

Bone morphogenetic protein
Developmental genes and proteins
TGFβ domain